Fabricio Oscar Alvarenga (born 17 January 1996) is an Argentine footballer who plays for Rukh Lviv.

References

External links
 
 

1996 births
Living people
Sportspeople from Misiones Province
Argentine footballers
Argentine expatriate footballers
Club Atlético Vélez Sarsfield footballers
Coritiba Foot Ball Club players
Deportivo Morón footballers
FC Olimpik Donetsk players
FC Rukh Lviv players
Argentine Primera División players
Primera Nacional players
Ukrainian Premier League players
Association football wingers
Argentine expatriate sportspeople in Brazil
Expatriate footballers in Brazil
Argentine expatriate sportspeople in Ukraine
Expatriate footballers in Ukraine